Óscar Olavarría Araya (20 August 1951 – 27 January 2000) was a Chilean actor, singer and comedian from Santiago. He died in a car accident on Chile Route 68 while en route to a show at Viña del Mar.

Filmography

Estació D'enllaç (1995)
Questio of Colors (1995) 
The Villa (1986)
Jappening with Ja (1978–1999)
Fanny Joe-T (1984)
The Siren of the Sea Blancarosa Blava (1984)
A Happy Family (1982)
Jealousy (1982)
The Fifth of the Joint (1981)
Dragon, St. George and the Knights Kaska (1981)
Villa's Aromos (1981)

References

External links

20th-century Chilean male actors
University of Chile alumni
2000 deaths
1950 births
Chilean male film actors
Road incident deaths in Chile
Chilean male comedians

Chilean people of Basque descent